Cathedral Church of All Saints may refer to:
 Cathedral Church of All Saints, Wakefield
 Cathedral Church of All Saints, Derby
 Cathedral Church of All Saints (Milwaukee)
 Cathedral Church of All Saints (St. Thomas, U.S. Virgin Islands)